Godzilla is an American animated monster television series produced by Hanna-Barbera, in association with Henry G. Saperstein. The series aired on NBC on September 9, 1978 with the title The Godzilla Power Hour. The series continued to air until 1981, packaged with other series under various titles.

The Godzilla Power Hour consisted of half-hour episodes of Godzilla and Jana of the Jungle. A total of 13 original episodes were produced in 1978, with the first eight airing as part of The Godzilla Power Hour. On November 4, 1978, the show was expanded to 90 minutes with the addition of Jonny Quest reruns and retitled The Godzilla Super 90. Split off into its own half-hour, the show aired in its own half-hour timeslot as simply Godzilla on September 8, 1979, and then as The Godzilla/Globetrotters Adventure Hour on November 10, 1979, before another repackaging as The Godzilla/Dynomutt Hour on September 27, 1980, and then The Godzilla/Hong Kong Phooey Hour until its cancellation on May 16, 1981.

The series acquired the retronym of Godzilla: The Original Animated Series for its DVD release.

The series introduced the canonical character Brock Borden to the Godzilla franchise.

Premise 
The series follows the adventures of a team of scientists on the Calico, a hydrofoil research vessel, headed by Captain Carl Majors. The rest of the crew include scientist Dr. Quinn Darien, her nephew Pete Darien and her research assistant Brock Borden. Also along for the ride is Godzooky, the "cowardly nephew" of Godzilla and Pete's best friend, in a comic foil role in the show. Godzooky can attempt to fly using the small wings under his arms. Whenever Godzooky tries to breathe fire, he usually just coughs up smoke rings.

The group often call upon Godzilla by using a special signaller when in danger, such as attacks by other giant monsters. Godzooky is also able to roar to summon Godzilla. Godzilla's size in the animated series shifts radically, sometimes within a single episode or even a single scene. For instance, Godzilla's claws can wrap around a large ship, and only minutes later the team of scientists fit rather neatly on Godzilla's palm. In addition, Godzilla's trademark atomic breath is altered so he breathes simple fire. He can also shoot laser beams from his eyes much like Superman's heat vision.

Voice cast 
 Jeff David as Captain Carl Majors
 Brenda Thompson as Dr. Quinn Darien
 Hilly Hicks as Brock Borden
 Al Eisenmann as Pete Darien
 Don Messick as Godzooky
 B.J. Ward as Jana of the Jungle
 Michael Bell as Dr. Ben Cooper
 Ted Cassidy as Montaro/Godzilla (vocal effects)

Production 
In regard to the origin of the series, Joseph Barbera came up with the idea of licensing Godzilla. He explained in a 1990s interview "My job back then was to dig up new characters, new ideas, new shows, and I had wanted to do Godzilla for awhile. I liked the monster thing, and the way it looked, and I thought we could do a lot with it. So I contacted Henry Saperstein, who was a very good friend and we got talking about it. Then there was an executive at the network who wanted to get into the act, and urged us to lighten the storyline up. So, I came up with the character Godzooky, who was like his son. The show had a sort of father-son relationship, which we had done before on shows like Augie Doggie and Doggie Daddy and Jonny Quest." Doug Wildey, creator of Johnny Quest, came on board as producer.

Barbera said that he wanted the series to be more-or-less a straight adaptation of the movie series, but, "When they start telling you in Standards and Practices, 'Don't shoot any flame at anybody, don't step on any buildings or cars,' then pretty soon, they've taken away all the stuff he represents. That became the problem, to maintain a feeling of Godzilla and at the same time cut down everything that he did. We managed to get a fair show out of it. It was OK. Godzooky kind of got the kids going."

Episodes

Season 1 (1978)

Season 2 (1979)

Broadcast 
Godzilla originally aired in these following formats on NBC:
 The Godzilla Power Hour (September 9, 1978 – October 28, 1978)
 The Godzilla Super 90 (November 4, 1978 – September 1, 1979)
 Godzilla (September 8, 1979 – November 3, 1979)
 The Godzilla/Globetrotters Adventure Hour (November 10, 1979 – September 20, 1980)
 The Godzilla/Dynomutt Hour (September 27, 1980 – November 15, 1980)
 The Godzilla/Hong Kong Phooey Hour (November 22, 1980 – May 16, 1981)
 Godzilla (May 23, 1981 – September 5, 1981)

The Godzilla Power Hour consisted of half-hour episodes of Godzilla and Jana of the Jungle. A total of 13 original episodes were produced in 1978, with the first eight airing as part of The Godzilla Power Hour. On November 4, 1978, the show was expanded to 90 minutes with the addition of Jonny Quest reruns and retitled The Godzilla Super 90.

For the second season beginning on September 15, 1979, the show was separated from its package programs and aired in its own half-hour timeslot as simply Godzilla. The original plan was to keep it as part of another 90-minute arc, only it was to be paired up with episodes of The New Shmoo and The Thing. The planned title was Godzilla Meets the Shmoo and The Thing. However, these plans dissolved and the show was simply aired on its own in its own half-hour timeslot. Hanna-Barbera would pair episodes of The New Fred and Barney Show with the Shmoo and the Thing instead as both Fred and Barney Meet the Shmoo and Fred and Barney Meet the Thing. Two months later, episodes of Godzilla and The Super Globetrotters were packaged together as The Godzilla/Globetrotters Adventure Hour which ran until September 20, 1980.

On September 27, 1980, after 26 half-hour episodes, the show went into reruns and Godzilla was once again teamed up with other Hanna-Barbera characters: the first was The Godzilla/Dynomutt Hour (also appearing in this series were reruns of 1971's The Funky Phantom), which ran until November 15, 1980, followed by The Godzilla/Hong Kong Phooey Hour which ran until May 16, 1981. On May 23, the show returned to the half-hour format as Godzilla and the last regular showing aired on September 5, 1981 (to be replaced by The Smurfs, which would last three times as long as Godzilla did). Throughout the 1980s until the late 1990s, the series rested in limbo (with the exception of a limited VHS videocassette release of two episodes). Since 1993, it has been rebroadcast on TNT, Cartoon Network and Boomerang, as well as on Retro TV for a brief time on Saturday mornings between 2015 and 2016.

Home media 
The first 13 episodes from the first season were released on DVD, in three separate volumes titled Godzilla: The Original Animated Series. Volume 1 contains the first four episodes, Volume 2 contains the next four and Volume 3 contains the last five.

As of November 9, 2011, all episodes from the first season became available for streaming on Netflix and Hulu. The second-season episodes of Godzilla have never been officially released on any home media format. On August 9, 2021, Toho on their official Godzilla YouTube channel has released the series in a set of three parts per episode.

Spoofs 
 In response to the Y2K hype, Cartoon Network created a short – "Godzilla vs. the Y2K Bug" (1999) – in which the Calico is attacked by a giant personified, talking Y2K Bug. The Godzilla calling device turns out to be useless this time, because Captain Majors forgot to update the embedded microchip.
 Dr. Quinn Darien appeared as Dr. Gale Melody, a music expert, in the Harvey Birdman, Attorney at Law episode "Shoyu Weenie" voiced by Grey DeLisle.

References

Sources

External links 
 Godzilla at the official Godzilla website by Toho Co., Ltd.
 

1970s American animated television series
1978 American television series debuts
1980s American animated television series
1981 American television series endings
American children's animated action television series
American children's animated adventure television series
American children's animated science fiction television series
Japanese children's animated action television series
Japanese children's animated adventure television series
Japanese children's animated science fiction television series
Godzilla television series
Animated television shows based on films
NBC original programming
Animated television series about reptiles and amphibians
Television series by Hanna-Barbera
Television series by Warner Bros. Television Studios